{{Infobox film
| name           = Kill Your Darlings
| image          = Kill Your Darlings poster.jpg
| alt            = 
| caption        = Theatrical release poster
| director       = John Krokidas
| producer       = 
| screenplay     = John KrokidasAustin Bunn
| story          = Austin Bunn
| starring       = 
| music          = Nico Muhly
| cinematography = Reed Morano
| editing        = Brian A. Kates
| studio         = Killer FilmsBenaroya PicturesFuture Film
| distributor    = Sony Pictures Classics
| released       = 
| runtime        = 104 minutes<ref>{{cite web|title='KILL YOUR DARLINGS (15)|url=https://www.bbfc.co.uk/releases/kill-your-darlings-film|work=The Works|publisher=British Board of Film Classification|date=October 21, 2013|access-date=May 14, 2014}}</ref>
| country        = United States
| language       = English
| budget         = $5.6 million
| gross          = $1.6 million
| border         = yes
}}Kill Your Darlings is a 2013 American biographical drama film written by Austin Bunn and directed by John Krokidas in his feature film directorial debut. The film had its world premiere at the 2013 Sundance Film Festival, garnering positive first reactions. It was shown at the 2013 Toronto International Film Festival, and it had a limited theatrical North American release from October 16, 2013. Kill Your Darlings became available on Blu-ray and DVD, March 18, 2014 in the US, followed by its UK release on April 21, 2014.

The story is about the college days of some of the earliest members of the Beat Generation (Lucien Carr, Allen Ginsberg, William S. Burroughs, and Jack Kerouac), their interactions, and Carr's killing of his long-time friend David Kammerer in Riverside Park in Manhattan, New York City.

Plot
In 1944, poet Allen Ginsberg (Daniel Radcliffe) wins a place at Columbia University in New York City. He arrives as a very inexperienced freshman, but soon runs into Lucien Carr (Dane DeHaan), an unruly character who holds strong anti-establishment beliefs.

Ginsberg discovers that Carr only manages to stay at Columbia thanks to a professor working as a janitor, David Kammerer (Michael C. Hall), who writes all of Carr's term papers for him. Kammerer has a predatory relationship with Carr and is in love with him, pressuring Carr for sexual favors in exchange for assuring that he cannot be expelled.

As Ginsberg spent more time with Carr, he soon meets William S. Burroughs (Ben Foster), who is far into drug experimentation, and the writer Jack Kerouac (Jack Huston), who was a sailor at that time and expelled from Columbia. Together, these ambitious people decided to start a new literary movement named The New Vision as a rebellion towards laws, institutions and Ginsberg and Carr's lawful professor Steeves. As Ginsberg spirals into the lifestyle of drugs, alcohol and cigarettes along with his newfound friends, he slowly starts developing romantic feelings for Carr.

Carr tells Kammerer he is done with him and recruits Ginsberg to write his term papers instead. Kammerer, in retaliation, puts Kerouac's cat into the oven only for Kerouac to discover and rescue it in the middle of the night.

After a while, Kerouac and Carr attempt to run off and join the merchant marine together, hoping to go to Paris.

In a confrontation between Carr and Kammerer, Kammerer is killed by stabbing and Carr is arrested. Carr asks Ginsberg to write his deposition for him. Ginsberg is at first reluctant to help the unstable Carr, but after digging up more crucial evidence on Kammerer and his past relationship, he writes a piece titled "The Night in Question". The piece describes a more emotional event, in which Carr kills Kammerer who outright tells him to after being threatened with the knife, devastated by this final rejection. Carr rejects the "fictional" story, and begs a determined Ginsberg not to reveal it to anybody, afraid that it will ruin him in the ensuing trial.

From Carr's mother, it is revealed that Kammerer was the first person to seduce Carr, when he was much younger and lived in Chicago. After the trial, Carr testified that the attack took place only because Kammerer was a sexual predator, and that Carr killed him in self-defense. Carr is not convicted of murder and receives only a short sentence for manslaughter.

Ginsberg then submits "The Night in Question" as his final term paper. On the basis of that shocking piece of prose, Ginsberg is faced with possible expulsion from Columbia. Either he must be expelled or he must embrace establishment values. He chooses the former, but is forced to leave his typescript behind. A week or two later he receives the typescript in the mail with an encouraging letter from his professor telling him to pursue his writing.

Cast
Daniel Radcliffe as Allen Ginsberg
Dane DeHaan as Lucien Carr
Michael C. Hall as David Kammerer
Jack Huston as Jack Kerouac
Ben Foster as William S. Burroughs
David Cross as Louis Ginsberg
Jennifer Jason Leigh as Naomi Ginsberg
Elizabeth Olsen as Edie Parker
John Cullum as Prof. Harrison Ross Steeves
Erin Darke as Gwendolyn
Zach Appelman as Luke Detweiler
David Rasche as Harry Carman
Jon DeVries as Mortimer P. Burroughs
Leslie Meisel as Edith Cohen
Nicole Signore as Page
Michael Cavadias as Ray Conklin
Jonathan Cantor as Ogden Nash
Kyra Sedgwick as Marion Carr
Kevyn Settle as Norman

Production
In 2008, while performing Equus on Broadway, Daniel Radcliffe auditioned and got the part of Ginsberg. Radcliffe went on to film the last two Harry Potter films, Deathly Hallows – Part 1 and Part 2, and with him unavailable for filming, Chris Evans, Jesse Eisenberg, and Ben Whishaw were cast without Radcliffe. Shortly after, financing for the film fell through. When director John Krokidas started production on the film again, he offered the role of Ginsberg back to Radcliffe.

Release

Critical reaction
, Kill Your Darlings holds a 76% approval rating on Rotten Tomatoes, based on 152 reviews with an average rating of 6.59/10. The website's critical consensus reads, "Bolstered by the tremendous chemistry between Daniel Radcliffe and Dane DeHaan, Kill Your Darlings casts a vivid spotlight on an early chapter in the story of the Beat Generation." On Metacritic, the film had an average score of 65 out of 100, based on 36 reviews, indicating "Generally Favorable" reviews. The film earned $1,030,064 in limited release.The Daily Telegraph granted the film a score of three out of five stars, stating that, "Unlike Walter Salles's recent adaptation of On the Road, which embraced the Beat philosophy with a wide and credulous grin, Kill Your Darlings is inquisitive about the movement's worth, and the genius of its characters is never assumed". Reviewing Kill Your Darlings after its showing at the 2013 Sundance Film Festival, critic Damon Wise of The Guardian lauded the film for being "the real deal, a genuine attempt to source the beginning of America's first true literary counterculture of the 20th century". Kill Your Darlings, wrote Wise, "creates a true sense of energy and passion, for once eschewing the clacking of typewriter keys to show artists actually talking, devising, and ultimately daring each other to create and innovate. And though it begins as a murder-mystery, Kill Your Darlings may be best described as an intellectual moral maze, a story perfectly of its time and yet one that still resonates today." Wise awarded the film four out of five stars. Justin Chang of Variety wrote, "A mysterious Beat Generation footnote is fleshed out with skilled performances, darkly poetic visuals and a vivid rendering of 1940s academia in Kill Your Darlings. Directed with an assured sense of style that pushes against the narrow confines of its admittedly fascinating story, John Krokidas' first feature feels adventurous yet somewhat hemmed-in as it imagines a vortex of jealousy, obsession and murder that engulfed Allen Ginsberg, William S. Burroughs and Jack Kerouac in the early days of their literary revolution."

Historical inaccuracies or questionable assertions
Ginsberg's "long-time confidant and secretary, head of the Allen Ginsberg Trust," Bob Rosenthal, argues that the film is "a superb evocation of young college students in the midst of World War II finding their unique means of expression in the world." However, he states, it also contains a number of inaccuracies: "The large fabrications in the film are not so worrisome as the small ones. In any case, when the truth is stepped on and the nuance of truth is denied, the message becomes moribund." Caleb Carr went on to describe Kammerer as a sexual predator 14 years older than Lucien Carr, who first met Lucien when the latter was pubescent and had repeatedly taken advantage of the younger man's naivete and desperation for a strong male influence after being abandoned by his natural father. Furthermore, Kerouac, who wanted only platonic friendship from Lucien, provoked the jealousy of Kammerer. In contrast, according to Jack Kerouac's biographer Dennis McNally's account, Lucien Carr had always insisted, which William Burroughs (a childhood friend of Kammerer in St. Louis) believed, that he never had sex with Kammerer.

Accolades

See alsoAnd the Hippos Were Boiled in Their Tanks'', a collaborative novel by Burroughs and Kerouac inspired the events depicted in the film.

References

External links

 
 
 
 

2013 films
2013 biographical drama films
2013 directorial debut films
2013 independent films
2013 LGBT-related films
2013 romantic drama films
2013 thriller drama films
2010s English-language films
2010s romantic thriller films
American biographical drama films
American independent films
American LGBT-related films
American romantic drama films
American romantic thriller films
American thriller drama films
Biographical films about LGBT people
Biographical films about poets
Casting controversies in film
Films about the Beat Generation
Films about student societies
Films produced by Christine Vachon
Films scored by Nico Muhly
Films set in 1944
Films set in the 1940s
Films set in New York City
Films set in Columbia University
Films shot in New York City
Gay-related films
Killer Films films
LGBT-related controversies in film
LGBT-related romantic drama films
LGBT-related thriller drama films
Romance films based on actual events
Sony Pictures Classics films
Thriller films based on actual events
William S. Burroughs
2010s American films